also known simply as  or  is a Japanese light novel series written by Shu and illustrated by Yoshinori Shizuma. The series originally began as a web novel in April 2017 on the user-generated novel publishing website Shōsetsuka ni Narō when it was later acquired by ASCII Media Works, which officially began to publish it in March 2018. A manga adaptation by Kayaharuka was serialized online from July 2018 to July 2021, when it ended due to the author's death. An anime television series adaptation produced by Silver Link aired from July to September 2020. A second season premiered in January 2023.

Plot
After 2,000 years of countless wars and strife, the demon king Anos Voldigoad made a deal with the human hero, Kanon, to sacrifice his own life to ensure peace could flourish. Reincarnating 2,000 years later, Anos finds that royal demons now harshly rule over lower class hybrid demons in a society that values Anos's pureblood descendants over the demons who interbred with other species, such as humans and spirits. Finding that magic as a whole has begun to decline and his descendants weaker as a result of the peace he created, Anos, now technically a hybrid himself, decides to reclaim his former title. However, he must first graduate from the Demon King Academy, where he is labeled a total misfit.

Characters

Anos is a reincarnated demon king who existed 2,000 years prior to the start of the series.

Misha's elder twin sister. She is the original descendant of Ivis Necron (one of the seven Elder Demon Emperors) and known as the Witch of Destruction due to her Demon Eyes of Destruction.

A girl who had met Anos in the day of Demon King Academy's entrance exam, then made friend with him. She is younger twin sister of Sasha, who is a descendant of Ivis Necron, but Misha is not considered as a noblewoman like her sister.
 

A transfer student who is a member of the Generation of Chaos. He is also the reincarnation of Hero Kanon.

A classmate of Anos' who is a Unitarian.

An exchange student from the Hero Academy who belongs to the Selection Class "Jerga Kanon" in the academy. Also befriended by Anos.

At first she was thought to be a reincarnation of the Hero Kanon, but then it was revealed that she was actually a mass-produced source clone created by Eleonore Bianca.
 

A swordsman who was Anos' right-hand man 2,000 years prior to the start of the series.
 

She is considered as the ruler and mother of all spirits.

A hero who existed 2,000 years prior to the start of the series.

Anos's former homeroom teacher who was a pureblood royal and daughter of Elio Ludowell, one of the Demon Emperors. She was later killed and reincarnated into a half-demon.

A demon duke from the Indu Family and brother of Leorig.

One of the Demon Lords and the heir of the Indu Family.

Media

Light novels
The series was first published online as a web novel in April 2017 on the user-generated novel publishing website Shōsetsuka ni Narō by Shu. It was later acquired by ASCII Media Works, who published the first volume as a light novel under their Dengeki Bunko imprint in March 2018. Thirteen volumes have been released as of February 2023. The light novel is licensed in North America by J-Novel Club. At Anime NYC 2022, J-Novel Club announced that the light novel will be released in print by Yen Press.

Manga
A manga adaptation with art by Kayaharuka was serialized online via Square Enix's Manga UP! website from July 2018 to July 2021 and was collected in four tankōbon volumes. Square Enix published the manga in English. On July 10, 2021, it was announced that the manga adaptation was cancelled due to Kayaharuka's illness as it was previously claimed they were undergoing treatment. It was later announced on July 13 that Kayaharuka passed away on July 6 from pancreatic cancer.

Anime

An anime television series adaptation was announced at the "Dengeki Bunko Aki no Namahōsō Festival" event on October 6, 2019. The anime was originally set to premiere in April 2020, but it was delayed until July 2020 due to production complications resulting from the COVID-19 pandemic. The series was animated by Silver Link and directed by Masafumi Tamura, with Shin Oonuma serving as chief director. Jin Tanaka handled the series composition, while Kazuyuki Yamayoshi designed the characters, and Keiji Inai composed the music. The 13-episode anime aired from July 4 to September 26, 2020. Civilian performed the opening theme , while Tomori Kusunoki performed the ending theme . Crunchyroll streamed the series. 

On September 4, 2020, Aniplex of America announced that the series would receive an English dub, which premiered the following day.

On March 6, 2021, it was announced that the series would receive a second split-cour season with the staff and cast reprising their respective roles. Yūichirō Umehara replaced Tatsuhisa Suzuki as the voice of Anos Voldigoad for the second season. The first cour premiered on January 8, 2023. On February 11, 2023, it was announced that the seventh episode of the season and beyond would be postponed due to COVID-19.

Reception

Sales 
According to the official English anime website, the light novels has over 2.2 million copies published as of 2023.

References

Notes

External links
  at Shōsetsuka ni Narō 
  
  
  
  
 

2020 anime television series debuts
2018 Japanese novels
Adventure anime and manga
Anime and manga based on light novels
Aniplex
Demon novels
Dengeki Bunko
Gangan Comics manga
Fantasy anime and manga
J-Novel Club books
Japanese webcomics
Kadokawa Dwango franchises
Light novels
Light novels first published online
Fiction about reincarnation
Romance anime and manga
Shōnen manga
Shōsetsuka ni Narō
Silver Link
Television shows based on light novels
Tokyo MX original programming
Webcomics in print
Yen Press titles